is a Japanese manga series written and illustrated by Ranjō Miyake. It ran in Shogakukan's seinen manga magazine Big Comic Spirits from 2002 to 2003. An anime television series adaptation by Geno Studio was broadcast from January to March 2020. The series is streamed worldwide by Amazon Prime.

Plot
In ancient China, martial artists had developed a psychoactive technique that allows its users to enter the subconsciousness of the human mind by manipulating their enemies' memories via their "Peak", where their most treasured memories are visible and their "Valley", where their most negative memories are suppressed. Later during the 21st century, an organization called "The Company" are tasked with retrieving and securing the descendants of said martial artists by turning them into "Pets", mindless hitmen against various targets who might pose a threat. Tsukasa and Hiroki, a master/pet duo who goes by the name Tsubushiya follows orders from the company as they slowly begin uncovering its secrets as well as a plot involving colleague Satoru and his former foster father, Hayashi.

Characters

Media

Manga
Written and illustrated by Ranjō Miyake, Pet was serialized in Shogakukan's seinen manga magazine Weekly Big Comic Spirits fron 2002 to 2003. Shogakukan compiled its chapters into five tankōbon volumes, released from January 30 to December 25, 2003. Enterbrain released a remastered edition in 2009.

Volume list

Anime
An anime television series adaptation of the 2009 remastered edition was announced in March 2018. The series was originally scheduled to premiere in October 2019, but it was delayed to air from January 6 to March 30, 2020 on Tokyo MX, BS11, and AT-X. The series is directed by Takahiro Omori and written by Sadayuki Murai, with animation by Geno Studio. Junichi Hayama is handling the character designs, and Twin Engine is producing the series. It is streamed worldwide by Amazon.  TK from Ling tosite Sigure performed the series' opening theme song , while Memai Siren performed the series' ending theme song "image _". The series ran for 13 episodes.

Episode list

References

External links
  
 

2020 anime television series debuts
Enterbrain manga
Kadokawa Dwango franchises
Psychological thriller anime and manga
Seinen manga
Shogakukan manga
Supernatural anime and manga